Jane King may refer to:

 Jane King (poet) (born 1952), St. Lucian poet
 Jane King (journalist) (born 1968), American journalist